Henry of Lipá (Czech: Jindřich z Lipé; died 26 August 1329) was a prominent Czech nobleman, marshal, and powerful magnate in the Kingdom of Bohemia.

Biography
Henry was born to the prominent Ronovci family, though the date of his birth remains unknown. He first appears in documents from the royal court of Prague in 1296 with his brother, Čeněk of Ojvina. He fought against the King Albert I of Germany, defending Kutná Hora in 1304 together with his friend . He began to appear more regularly on documents from 1306, and he was counted among the country's most important nobles. 

Through his influence, Henry helped Henry of Bohemia to the throne, but also he contributed to his expulsion from the country a few years later. In 1310, John of Bohemia appointed him as his chamberlain and as Supreme Marshal of the Kingdom of Bohemia. In 1311, he was removed from office, but he returned in 1315. At the instigation of Queen Elizabeth of Bohemia, he was arrested and accused of conspiracy against the king. However, some of the nobility and his romantic partner, the queen widow Elizabeth Richeza of Poland, sided with Henry. He was released in 1316 after six months in prison. 

From 1319 until his death he was the provincial governor in Moravia, and during the king's absence between 1319 and 1321, he also served as the provincial governor of Bohemia.

He died on 26 August 1329 after spending his last years with Elisabeth Richeza at his court in Brno. He is buried in the  Basilica of the Assumption of Our Lady (Old Brno Abbey) in Brno.

Family
He also had three daughters, Kateřina, Klára and Markéta.

References

Bibliography

Medieval Bohemian nobility
14th-century Bohemian people
Date of birth unknown